Gavrilsevo is a rural locality (a village) in Penkinskoye Rural Settlement, Kameshkovsky District, Vladimir Oblast, Russia. The population was 10 as of 2010.

Geography 
Gavrilsevo is located 25 km southwest of Kameshkovo (the district's administrative centre) by road. Neverkovo is the nearest rural locality.

References 

Rural localities in Kameshkovsky District